Banova Jaruga railway station is a railway station on Dugo Selo–Novska railway in Croatia. Located in Banova Jaruga. Railroad continued to Kutina in one, in other direction to Lipovljani and the third direction towards to Lipik. Banova Jaruga railway station consists of 5 railway track.

See also 
 Croatian Railways
 Zagreb–Belgrade railway

References 

Railway stations in Croatia